Viktors Lācis (born 28 November 1977) is a Latvian retired middle-distance runner who specialised in the 800 metres. He represented his country at the 2000 Summer Olympics, as well as two World Championships. He later also competed in the 400 metres hurdles.

International competitions

Personal bests
Outdoor
200 metres – 21.75 (+1.5 m/s, Wichita 2002)
400 metres – 46.56 (Terre Haute 2001)
800 metres – 1:46.07 (Riga 1997)
1500 metres – 3:58.38 (Malmö 1998)
400 metres hurdles – 49.60 (Eugene 2002) NR
Indoor
400 metres – 47.94 (Lincoln 2002)
800 metres – 1:49.50 (Cedar Falls 1999)

References

All-Athletics profile

1977 births
Living people
Latvian male middle-distance runners
Latvian male hurdlers
World Athletics Championships athletes for Latvia
Olympic athletes of Latvia
Athletes (track and field) at the 2000 Summer Olympics
People from Rēzekne Municipality